A mutual insurance company is an insurance company owned entirely by its policyholders. Any profits earned by a mutual insurance company are either retained within the company or rebated to policyholders in the form of dividend distributions or reduced future premiums. In contrast, a stock insurance company is owned by investors who have purchased company stock; any profits generated by a stock insurance company are distributed to the investors without necessarily benefiting the policyholders.

History 
The concept of mutual insurance originated in England in the late 17th century to cover losses due to fire. The mutual/casualty insurance industry began in the United States in 1752 when Benjamin Franklin established the Philadelphia Contributionship for the Insurance of Houses From Loss by Fire. Mutual property/casualty insurance companies exist now in nearly every country around the globe.

The global trade association for the industry, the International Cooperative and Mutual Insurance Federation, claims 216 members in 74 countries, in turn representing over 400 insurers. In North America the National Association of Mutual Insurance Companies (NAMIC), founded in 1895, is the sole representative of U.S. and Canadian mutual insurance companies in the areas of advocacy and education.

Recent developments in the United States 
The "mutual holding company" structure was first introduced in Iowa in 1995, and has spread since then. There have been concerns that the mutual holding company conversion is disadvantageous for the owners of the company, the policyholders.
The major disadvantage of mutual insurance companies is the difficulty of raising capital.

In the 111th Congress, Carolyn Maloney sponsored a bill that she claimed would have protected mutual holding company owners. The measure, died in committee.

Mutual holding companies are one way to undergo privatization, also called demutualization.

List of mutual insurance companies

Multinational 
 Association Internationale de la Mutualité

Bermuda 
 Oil Insurance Limited

Canada

Denmark 
 Tryg (owned 60% by the mutual company Tryghedsgruppen)
 Lærerstandens Brandforsikring

Faroe Islands 
 The Faroe Insurance Company (Tryggingarfelagið Føroyar)

Finland 
 Pohjantähti Mutual Insurance  www.pohjantahti.fi
 Mutual Insurance Company Turva www.turva.fi

France 

General Mutual insurance companies
 Groupama
 MACIF
 
 Matmut
 MAAF
 MMA
 SMACL
 Thélem Assurances
 Mocf
 Mutlog

Health insurance companies

 ACORIS Mutuelles
 Almutra
 Avenir Santé Mutuelle
 Choralis Mutuelle le libre choix
 Complévie
 CMIP
 EMOA
 Groupe Victor HUGO
 La Maison du Fonctionnaire
 La Mutuelle Catalane
 MBA Mutuelle
 MCEN
 M Comme Mutuelle
 MFCF
 Mutuelle Entrain
 Mutuelle Générale d'Avignon
 Mutuelle Générale des Cheminots
 MIPSS Auvergne
 MOAT
 Mutuelle Matra Hachette
 Mutuelle du Pays Martégal
 Mutuelle du Pays de Vaucluse
 Mutuelle du Rempart
 Mutuelle SEPR
 Mutuelle SERAMM
 Mutuelles du Soleil
 Precocia
 Sereina Mutuelle

 
 Mutualia
 Mutuelle Générale
 Harmonie Mutuelle*
 MNT

Germany 
Arbeitsgemeinschaft der Versicherungsvereine auf Gegenseitigkeit e.V.
VERBAND DER VERSICHERUNGSVEREINE

Japan 
 Asahi Mutual Life Insurance Company
 Meiji Yasuda Life Insurance Company
 Nippon Life Insurance Company
 Sumitomo Life Insurance Company

New Zealand 
 FMG Insurance
 MAS

Philippines 
 Insular Life

Slovenia 
 Vzajemna

South Africa 
 PPS (Professional Provident Society)
 Iemas
 AVBOB

Spain 
 Mutua Madrileña

Sweden 

 Alecta
 Dina Försäkringar
 Folksam
 Länsförsäkringar
 Skandia

United Kingdom 
 Shepherds Friendly Society
 Education Mutual
 The Equitable Life Assurance Society
 NFU Mutual
 Engage Mutual Assurance
 Health Shield
 Royal London Group
 Together Mutual Insurance
 The Military Mutual
 Scottish Friendly
 UIA Mutual
 Liverpool Victoria

United States

See also 
 Protection and indemnity insurance

References

Further reading 
 Emery, Herbert, and George Emery. A Young Man’s Benefit: The Independent Order of Odd Fellows And Sickness Insurance in the United States and Canada, 1860-1929 (McGill-Queen's University Press, 1999).
 Van Leeuwen, Marco H.D. Mutual Insurance, 1550-2015: From Guild Welfare and Friendly Societies to Contemporary Micro-Insurers (Palgrave Macmillan, 2016) 321 pp.  online review, A standard scholarly history

External links 
 NAMIC – National Association of Mutual Insurance Companies
 ICMIF – International Cooperative and Mutual Insurance Federation
 AFM – Association of Financial Mutuals (UK)
 University of Wisconsin Center for Cooperatives: Research on the Economic Impact of Cooperatives. Economic Impacts of Cooperatives › Financial Services > Mutual Insurance

 
Cooperatives
Mutualism (movement)
Types of insurance